is a Japanese professional footballer who plays as a midfielder for Fukushima United.

Career

Sanfrecce Hiroshima 
Yusa debuted for Sanfrecce Hiroshima in a 2-2 home draw against Gamba Osaka in the 2007 J1 League on 1 December. Yusa also made two appearances in the 2007 J. League Cup. Sanfrecce Hiroshima finished third last of the 2007 J1 League table and were subsequently relegated to J2 League upon a 2-1 aggregate loss against Kyoto Sanga FC during the 2007 J.League promotion/relegation Series. Sanfrecce then claimed the 2008 J2 League having claimed 100 points in 24 matches, and were promoted to the 2009 J1 League. Yusa, however, was loaned out to Zweigen Kanazawa where he participated in the 2009 Japanese Regional Leagues.

ONGC
In January 2011, Yusa was transferred from Paraguayan División Intermedia side San Lorenzo to Indian I-League side ONGC. He scored his first goal in the 2010–11 I-League season in a 4-0 home win against Hindustan Aero on 9 April 2011. ONGC finished in 13th position of the 2010–11 I-League table and were relegated to the I-League 2nd Division for the 2012 season. Yusa stayed with ONGC during the 2012 I-League 2nd Division, scoring 6 times and helped them gain promotion back to the I-League at the end of the season.

Mohun Bagan
On 1 May 2013, Yusa agreed to join I-League side Mohun Bagan for the 2013–14 I-League season. In the 2014-15 Season he captained Mohun Bagan to the I-league title and also won the Federation Cup.

NorthEast United
After three seasons with Mohun Bagan, Yusa signed with NorthEast United of the Indian Super League on loan from Mohun Bagan Athletic Club. On 1 October 2016, Yusa made his debut for NorthEast United against Kerala Blasters and also scored the winning goal in a 1–0 victory for his side.

East Bengal F.C
After four seasons with Mohun Bagan, Yusa signed for arch rivals East Bengal for the 2017-18 I-League season.

NEROCA
Yusa joined I-League side NEROCA for the 2018–19 I-League season, and scored few goals.

Chennai City F.C
Yusa joined I-League side and the champion team of 2018-19 I-League Chennai City FC this year.

Career statistics

Honours

Mohun Bagan 
 I-League: 2014–15
 Federation Cup: 2015–16

References

External links
 
 

1988 births
Living people
Association football people from Fukushima Prefecture
Japanese footballers
People from Fukushima, Fukushima
Association football midfielders
Sanfrecce Hiroshima players
Zweigen Kanazawa players
Fukushima United FC players
Indian Super League players
ONGC FC players
Mohun Bagan AC players
NorthEast United FC players
Chennai City FC players
J1 League players
J2 League players
J3 League players
I-League players
Japanese expatriate sportspeople in Paraguay
Japanese expatriate sportspeople in India
Expatriate footballers in Paraguay
Expatriate footballers in India